Patricia Yapp Syau Yin is a Malaysian military pilot and flight instructor. She is Asia’s first female MiG-29 fighter pilot.

Life 

Yapp was born and raised in Sandakan, Sabah, Malaysia. She became interested in a career in aviation when her older brother became a pilot, but her father objected to her plans. After completing high school, she moved to Kuala Lumpur to study law at university. In 1997, in her second semester of study, she applied for the Royal Malaysian Air Force cadet programme without her parents' knowledge. After successfully completing the first stage of the selection process, she told her parents and they agreed to her career change.

In 2000, Yapp graduated from University of Technology, Malaysia with a diploma in Aeronautical Engineering. After completing her flight training in 2002, she chose to be a fighter pilot and flew Aermacchi MB-339 aircraft for four years. After this, she became an operational and tactical lead pilot with the No. 17/19 Smokey Bandits Squadron in Kuantan that flies the MiG-29N Fulcrum air superiority jets. She also performed in the squadron's aerobatics displays at air shows, for example in Singapore in 2012. In January 2014 Yapp qualified as a flight instructor.

In 2010, Yapp married fellow pilot S. Thayala Kumar Ravi Varman.

References

Living people
People from Sabah
Malaysian aviators
Royal Malaysian Air Force personnel
Women air force personnel
Flight instructors
Year of birth missing (living people)